Asadabad (also Romanized as Asadābād) is a village in Khafri Rural District, in the Central District of Sepidan County, Fars Province, Iran. At the 2006 census, its population was 21, in 6 families.

References 

Populated places in Sepidan County